Malye Gari is a rural locality (a village) in Baydarovskoye Rural Settlement, Nikolsky District, Vologda Oblast, Russia. The population was 3 as of 2002.

Geography 
The distance to Nikolsk is 40 km, to Baydarovo is 16 km. Zaymishche is the nearest rural locality.

References 

Rural localities in Nikolsky District, Vologda Oblast